"Sick and Tired" is a song by American singer-songwriter Anastacia from her third studio album, Anastacia (2004). "Sick and Tired" was written by Anastacia, Dallas Austin, and Glen Ballard; as a hook line, it samples vocals sung in Punjabi from the song "Let the Music Play" by Italian music project Shamur. The song was released as the album's second single on July 19, 2004, to positive reception from music critics. The single reached number one in the Czech Republic, charted at number two on the European Hot 100, and peaked inside the top five in several countries, including Austria, Denmark, Germany, Italy, the Netherlands, Spain, Switzerland, and the United Kingdom.

Critical reception and composition
AllMusic editor Matthew Chisling said that Anastacia "seams a bit of R&B into her melodies." Caroline Sullivan of The Guardian wrote that on "Sick and Tired" Anastacia claims: "I'm sick and tired of being sick and tired. She sounds it." Andy Gill of The Independent clarified that this song is not ironically connected to Anastacia's fight with cancer but a "complaint about a lover's 'so malign' attitude." Stylus Magazine editor Dom Passantino referenced the sampled vocal in the song, opining "she can't just throw down some random Indian guy singing as a hook and then go 'Yo, whatever he said then I'm that'... except she does." He concluded that the song is "genuinely interesting, genuinely experimental, and [a] genuinely good single".

Music video
The music video for "Sick and Tired", directed by Philipp Stölzl, was shot in Los Angeles on May 25, 2004. When the video begins, Anastacia is shown applying for a role and introduces herself as Sara Forest. Then she plays Holly in the film she is auditioning for. Throughout the video, Anastacia is performing the song in a small room with the band. The video is intercut with black-and-white scenes from the rehearsal on which their relationship is based. At first they fall in love, but after several dates, the boyfriend hits her, they split up and she wants him to leave.

Track listings

UK CD1 and European CD single
 "Sick and Tired" (album version) – 3:30
 "Sick and Tired" (Jason Nevins Funkrock remix edit) – 3:25

UK CD2 and European maxi-CD single
 "Sick and Tired" (album version) – 3:30
 "Twisted Girl" – 3:56
 "Sick and Tired" (Jason Nevins Electrochill remix) – 6:30
 "Sick and Tired" (video) – 3:30

German mini-CD single
 "Sick and Tired" – 3:29
 "Twisted Girl" – 3:56

Australian CD single
 "Sick and Tired" – 3:30
 "Sick and Tired" (Jason Nevins Funkrock remix edit) – 3:25
 "Sick and Tired" (Jason Nevins Electrochill remix) – 6:30
 "Twisted Girl" – 3:56

Credits and personnel
Credits are taken from the Anastacia album booklet.

Studios
 Recorded at O'Henry Studios (Burbank, California), Larrabee East, Record One (Los Angeles), and Record Plant (Hollywood, California)
 Mixed at South Beach Studios (Miami Beach, Florida)
 Mastered at Sterling Sound (New York City)

Personnel

 Anastacia – writing, vocals
 Glen Ballard – writing, keyboards, production
 Dallas Austin – writing, keyboards, MIDI drums, production
 Tony Reyes – guitars
 Colin Wolfe – bass
 Ric Wake – lead vocal production
 Rick Sheppard – recording, MIDI and sound design
 Bill Malina – recording
 Thomas R. Yezzi – recording (vocals)
 Tom Lord-Alge – mixing
 Femio Hernandez – second mix engineer
 Anthony Kilhoffer – assistant engineering
 J.D. Andrew – assistant engineering
 Tom Sweeney – assistant engineering
 Jeff Burns – assistant engineering
 Cesar Guevara – assistant engineering
 Ted Jensen – mastering

Charts

Weekly charts

Year-end charts

Certifications

Release history

References

2004 singles
2004 songs
Anastacia songs
Daylight Records singles
Epic Records singles
Number-one singles in the Czech Republic
Song recordings produced by Dallas Austin
Songs written by Anastacia
Songs written by Dallas Austin
Songs written by Glen Ballard